Tomás Eduardo Carriço Paçó (born 19 April 2000) is a Portuguese futsal player who plays as a defender for Sporting CP and the Portugal national team. Tomás Paçó has a twin brother, Bernardo, who is a professional futsal goalkeeper.

Honours

Sporting
 Liga Portuguesa: 2020–21, 2021–22
 Taça de Portugal: 2019–20, 2021–22
 Taça da Liga de Futsal: 2020–21, 2021–22
 Supertaça de Futsal: 2021
 UEFA Futsal Champions League: 2020–21

Portugal

 FIFA Futsal World Cup: 2021
 UEFA Futsal Championship: 2022
 Futsal Finalissima: 2022

References

External links

Tomás Paçó at playmakerstats.com (formerly thefinalball.com)

2000 births
Living people
Sportspeople from Lisbon
Futsal defenders
Portuguese men's futsal players
Sporting CP futsal players